Hibbertia oligodonta is a species of flowering plant in the family Dilleniaceae and is endemic to central Queensland. It is a low, compact shrub with many stems and egg-shaped or wedge-shaped leaves with the narrower end towards the base, and yellow flowers with 22 to 38 stamens arranged around three glabrouscarpels.

Description 
There are usually up to four teeth on each side of the leaves and both surfaces are densely hairy.

Taxonomy 
Hibbertia oligodonta was first formally described in 1991 by Sally T. Reynolds in the journal Austrobaileya from specimens collected near Bauhinia, Queensland in 1964. The specific epithet (oligodonta) means "few-toothed", referring to the edges of the leaves.

Distribution and habitat 

Conservation status
This hibbertia is classified as of "least concern" under the Queensland Government Nature Conservation Act 1992.

See also 
 List of Hibbertia species

References 

oligodonta
Flora of Queensland
Plants described in 1991
Taxa named by Sally T. Reynolds